Tongeren was a constituency used to elect a single member of the Belgian Chamber of Representatives between 1839 and 1900. It replaced the Maastricht constituency after the Belgian claim to Maastricht was relinquished to the Netherlands under the Treaty of London (1839). In the Belgian parliament, two members elected for Maastricht in 1837 simply continued to sit as members for Tongeren.

Representatives

References

Defunct constituencies of the Chamber of Representatives (Belgium)